Trmice is a town in Ústí nad Labem District in the Ústí nad Labem Region of the Czech Republic. It has about 3,300 inhabitants.

Administrative parts
Villages of Koštov and Újezd are administrative parts of Trmice.

Geography
Trmice is located southwest of Ústí nad Labem, in its immediate vicinity. It lies on the border between the Most Basin and Central Bohemian Uplands. The Bílina River flows through the town. A small part of Lake Milada extends into the territory of Trmice.

History
In the 13th century, there was a fortress in Trmice. In the first half of the 17th century, it was rebuilt into a Baroque castle. The Old Castle was repaired in 1926, but it was demolished in 1965 due to considerable dilapidation.

Between 1939 and 1993, Trmice was a borough of the Ústí nad Labem. Since 1 January 1994 it has been a separate municipality again.

Demographics

Transport
The D8 motorway passes through the town.

Sights

The New Castle, also called Trmice Castle, is the main landmark of the town. It was designed by Heinrich von Ferstel and built in the Gothic Revival style in 1856–1863. Today it serves as a cultural centre, and as a museum with permanent exhibitions on the history of regional mining and industry and a model railway museum.

Notable people
Hermann Burghart (1834–1901), Austrian scenic designer and set decorator

Twin towns – sister cities

Trmice is twinned with:
 Königstein, Germany

References

External links

Cities and towns in the Czech Republic
Populated places in Ústí nad Labem District